Falak (also known as Fūlak) is a village in Banesh Rural District, Beyza District, Sepidan County, Fars Province, Iran. At the 2006 census, its population was 147, in 37 families.

References 

Populated places in Beyza County